Ah-gwah-ching is an unincorporated community in Shingobee Township, Cass County, Minnesota, United States, near Walker.

It is located along State Highways 200 (MN 200) and 371 (MN 371), two miles south-southeast of Walker.  Ah-gwah-ching has the ZIP code 56430.

The name Ah-gwah-ching means "out-of-doors" in the Ojibwe language.

References

Unincorporated communities in Cass County, Minnesota
Unincorporated communities in Minnesota